The Abbey of Santa Maria Casanova (Italian: Abbazia di Santa Maria di Casanova) was a Cistercian monastery located in Villa Celiera, Province of Pescara, Italy. Only a lone tower of the abbey now remains.

History
The abbey was founded in 1191 by the mother abbey of Tre Fontane in Rome, which derived from the Benedictine order at Clairvaux. Its construction was completed in 1208 and it was the first Cistercian abbey in Abruzzo.

It had as daughter abbeys the Abbey of St. Mary of Ripalta, San Pastore Abbey and Santo Spirito d'Ocre. It was ruled by the Cistercians until the suppression of religious orders in the Kingdom of Naples by Joseph Bonaparte in 1807.

Architecture
Nearly all the abbey buildings were razed after suppression. The only part still in place is the tower, recently restored.

See also
 List of Cistercian monasteries

References

Bibliography

External links

Maria di Casanova
Buildings and structures in the Province of Pescara
Towers in Italy